The Fair Store was a discount department store founded in 1874 in Chicago, Illinois.

History
Founder Ernst J. Lehmann decided on the name "The Fair Store" as he felt "the store was like a fair because it offered many different things for sale at a cheap price." Lehmann bought and sold goods on a cash-only basis; he offered odd prices (i. e., prices not in multiples of five cents) to save customers a few pennies on every purchase.  The flagship store moved to the corner of State and Adams Streets in 1875; a modern twelve-story building for the store would be completed on that site in 1897.

The Fair Store promoted itself as a discount department store in the early 1900s. In 1915, a booklet published by the store stated "The Fair Store is still, as it always has been and undoubtedly always will be, the store of the people, the down-town shopping center for the Savers, the market place for the Thrifty." In 1925 the business was sold to a syndicate headed by S.S. Kresge (predecessor firm of Kmart). Under its management, branches were opened on Milwaukee Avenue (1929), in Oak Park, Illinois (1929), at the Evergreen Plaza Shopping Center (1952), and at the Old Orchard Shopping Center (1956).

In 1957, Montgomery Ward purchased the State Street flagship store, as well as the Oak Park, Evergreen Plaza, and Old Orchard locations, from the Kresge syndicate in a bid to expand its Chicago operations; unlike many other retailers, Montgomery Ward had not joined in the construction of branch stores immediately following World War II.  Initially, these stores retained the Fair nameplate, and one more Fair Store would open, at Randhurst Mall in 1962. However, the Randhurst store would also be the first converted to the Montgomery Ward nameplate, in August 1963; the other locations would convert to the parent company's name plate in 1964. The flagship building on State Street was closed in 1984 and demolished in 1985. Though a new building was planned for the valuable real estate, none was constructed until 2001.

References

Retail companies established in 1874
History of Chicago
Defunct department stores based in Chicago
Defunct department stores based in Michigan
Retail companies disestablished in 1957
1874 establishments in Illinois
1957 disestablishments in Illinois
Demolished buildings and structures in Chicago
Buildings and structures demolished in 1985